The Land Before Time IV: Journey Through the Mists is a 1996 American direct-to-video animated adventure musical film produced by Universal Animation Studios (formerly known as Universal Cartoon Studios) and directed by Roy Allen Smith. It is the fourth installment in the Land Before Time series as well as the final installment to feature any cast members from the original film. The film was nominated for two Annie Awards. This was also the final film to feature Linda Gary as the voice of Grandma Longneck, as she died on October 5, 1995, and it was dedicated to her memory.

Plot 
Littlefoot notices a herd of Longnecks entering the Great Valley and informs his grandparents, who tell him that the Longnecks are their cousins and that they must go to greet them. Upon the herd's arrival, the Old One, the herd's leader, tells the Great Valley's residents that her herd has been migratory ever since a heavy period of rain turned their old home into a marshland called "The Land of Mists" and became the home of many dangerous creatures. Later, Littlefoot meets a female Longneck named Ali and invites her to play. He introduces her to his friends, but as she is not used to associating with diverse species, she is afraid of them. Meanwhile, Littlefoot’s Grandpa becomes ill. The Old One notes that she is familiar with the illness, having seen the illness many times in her life, which is lethal to any dinosaur unless they eat the petals of the "golden night flower," which only grows in the Land of Mists. When Littlefoot’s Grandma asks one of the other Longnecks who should take her to the night flower, the other Longnecks refuse to take Littlefoot’s Grandma there due to the risk.

Though Littlefoot has been warned by the Old One that the Land of Mists has gotten too dangerous, he becomes determined to save his grandfather and asks Ali to take him there. She agrees on the condition that Cera, Ducky, Petrie and Spike do not come along, claiming that they will only slow them down. As the two of them make their way, they pass through a cave and a sudden earthshake causes various stalagmites and stalactites to crash down, separating them. After Littlefoot’s Grandma tells Cera, Ducky, Petrie and Spike about Littlefoot's Grandpa's illness, Ali returns to the Valley and convinces Littlefoot's friends to help her free him. Meanwhile, Littlefoot tries to find a way out and meets an old male Archelon named Archie, who helps him dig through the rocks. As they work, Littlefoot and Archie are interrupted by a mostly-blind Deinosuchus named Dil and an Ichthyornis named Ichy, who intend to eat them. Dil and Ichy pursue Littlefoot and Archie, but are knocked out when Ali and Littlefoot's friends dig a hole in the rock wall and send rocks tumbling down on them. Archie (who helps Littlefoot and his friends escape Dil and Ichy for the first time) shows Littlefoot and his friends a way to the Land of Mists and reminds them to stay close together before departing. In the Land of Mists, Cera is separated from the group. The others meet a Megazostrodon that Ducky names Tickles because of his fur, which tickles her when she hugs him.

Immediately after, Tickles helps them find Cera. However, Cera falls into a river and is pursued by Dil and Ichy, who have now recovered from their prior knockout in the cave. Ali saves Cera and distracts the predators, after which Cera finally softens her earlier stance towards Ali. Later, Ali explains her prejudicial behavior, having never interacted with species outside of her own, but remarks that her attitude towards Littlefoot's friends has now changed. When the seven stop for the night, they realize they are in a field of night flowers after they bloom and quickly stock up on them. As they make their way home, Ichy and Dil return for one last attack. During a chase, Petrie is grabbed by Ichy but rescued thanks to Tickles, who tricks Ichy into biting Dil's tail rather than Petrie's stomach, giving him time to rejoin his friends. Dil becomes upset at Ichy, but they quickly resume the chase after Cera gives their alternate hiding spot away, during which Ducky falls into a river and becomes unconscious. Spike then speaks for the first time by calling out Ducky's name, which awakens her as she is about to be consumed by Dil. Ichy comes up to Littlefoot and says to him that he and the others are going to be his and Dil's next targets. Ducky escapes when Spike uses his tail to knock Ichy toward Dil's open jaws as she tries to consume Ducky. However, she instead gets Ichy after mistaking him for Ducky. Dil chomps Ichy by accident. Ichy barely escapes that and the two get into another argument. Finally, the two declare that they have had enough of each other and are going their separate ways forever. Immediately after she swats Ichy away with her tail, Dil bumped into a Hydrotherosaurus, who chased her away.

With the predators gone for good, Littlefoot and his friends say goodbye to Tickles and head home. They give Littlefoot’s Grandpa the flowers to eat and he fully recovers a few hours later. Ali then leaves with her herd, but not before trying to convince Spike to say goodbye, which he does not, as he is too interested in consuming leaves. The narrator concludes that Littlefoot and the others would indeed meet Ali again one day.

Voice cast 

 Scott McAfee as Littlefoot
 Candace Hutson as Cera
 Heather Hogan as Ducky
 Rob Paulsen as Spike
 Jeff Bennett as Petrie/Ichy
 Juliana Hansen as Ali
 Tress MacNeille as Ali's Mother/Dil
 Frank Welker as Tickles 
 Linda Gary as Grandma Longneck (in her final film role before her death of complications from brain cancer on October 5, 1995)
 Kenneth Mars as Grandpa Longneck  
 Charles Durning as Archie
 Carol Bruce as Old One    
 John Ingle as Narrator

Songs

Release 
The film was released on December 10, 1996 on VHS and April 1, 2003 on DVD.

Reception 
Joe Leydon of Variety recommended it to young children who enjoy Barney & Friends.  TV Guide rated it 2/5 stars and wrote, "Memories of Don Bluth's engaging original The Land Before Time continue to grow dimmer with this indifferent sequel to the animated dinosaur saga."  Michael Sauter of Entertainment Weekly rated a letter grade of "B" and wrote, "But if the formula hasn't changed, it hasn't fossilized, either." In August 2014, the New York Post ranked each of the 13 Land Before Time films released up to that point and placed Journey Through the Mists at number 7. The New York Post praised the character of Ali for adding "a little more girl power" to the series. The film received nominations for "Best Animated Video Production" and "Best Individual Achievement: Music in a Feature/Home Video Production" at the  25th Annie Awards in 1997, losing to Aladdin and the King of Thieves and Cats Don't Dance, respectively.

References

External links 

 

1996 films
1996 direct-to-video films
1996 animated films
1990s American animated films
Films scored by Michael Tavera
1990s English-language films
Animated films about dinosaurs
Direct-to-video sequel films
The Land Before Time films
Universal Animation Studios animated films
Universal Pictures direct-to-video animated films
1990s children's animated films
Films directed by Roy Allen Smith
Compositions by Leslie Bricusse